Lugovoy is a village in the Turar Ryskulov District, Jambyl Region, Kazakhstan.

Demographics 
According to the 2009 Kazakhstani Census, the village has a population of 10,242 (5,103 men and 5,139 women).

As of 1999, the village had 9,876 people (4,874 men and 5,002 women).

References 

Populated places in Jambyl Region